Mlungisi is a South African masculine given name. Notable people with the name include:

Mlungisi Bali (1990-2018), South African rugby union player
Mlungisi Ngubane (born 1956), South African football player and coach
Mlungisi Mdluli (born 1980), South African football midfielder
Mlungisi Zwelihle Gumede (born 1996), South African teacher, scholar and author living in Jozini